Lepidopilum is a genus of moss in family Pilotrichaceae. There are over 200 species in the genus.

Species

Lepidopilum affine Müll. Hal.
Lepidopilum amplirete (Sull.) Mitt.
Lepidopilum angustifrons Hampe
Lepidopilum apollinairei Broth. & Paris
Lepidopilum apophysatum Hampe
Lepidopilum arcuatum Mitt.
Lepidopilum armatum Mitt.
Lepidopilum aurifolium Mitt.
Lepidopilum ballivianii Herzog
Lepidopilum brevifolium Mitt.
Lepidopilum brevipes Mitt.
Lepidopilum caudatum Müll. Hal.
Lepidopilum caviusculum Mitt.
Lepidopilum chloroneuron (Taylor) Hampe & Lorentz
Lepidopilum convallium (Brid.) Mitt.
Lepidopilum curvifolium Mitt.
Lepidopilum curvirameum (Müll. Hal.) Paris
Lepidopilum cuspidans Mitt.
Lepidopilum diaphanum (Sw. ex Hedw.) Mitt.
Lepidopilum erectiusculum (Taylor) Mitt.
Lepidopilum falcatulum Müll. Hal.
Lepidopilum filiferum Besch.
Lepidopilum filosum Herzog
Lepidopilum flavescens Geh. & Hampe
Lepidopilum floresianum Renauld & Cardot
Lepidopilum frondosum Mitt.
Lepidopilum glaziovii Hampe
Lepidopilum grevilleanum Mitt.
Lepidopilum hirsutum (Besch.) Broth.
Lepidopilum inflexum Mitt.
Lepidopilum krauseanum Müll. Hal.
Lepidopilum lastii Mitt.
Lepidopilum leiomitrium Müll. Hal.
Lepidopilum leucomioides Broth.
Lepidopilum longifolium Hampe
Lepidopilum maculatum Müll. Hal.
Lepidopilum mniaceum Müll. Hal.
Lepidopilum mosenii Broth.
Lepidopilum muelleri (Hampe) Hampe
Lepidopilum nitidum Besch.
Lepidopilum niveum (Müll. Hal.) Kindb.
Lepidopilum ovalifolium (Duby) Broth.
Lepidopilum pallido-nitens (Müll. Hal.) Paris
Lepidopilum pectinatum Mitt.
Lepidopilum pergracile Müll. Hal.
Lepidopilum permarginatum R.S. Williams
Lepidopilum phyllophilum Broth.
Lepidopilum polytrichoides (Hedw.) Brid.
Lepidopilum rupestre Broth.
Lepidopilum scabrisetum (Schwägr.) Steere
Lepidopilum stillicidiorum Mitt.
Lepidopilum subsubulatum Geh. & Hampe
Lepidopilum subulatum Mitt.
Lepidopilum surinamense Müll. Hal.
Lepidopilum tenuifolium Mitt.
Lepidopilum tenuissimum Herzog
Lepidopilum tortifolium Mitt.
Lepidopilum verrucipes Cardot
Lepidopilum wallisii Müll. Hal.

References

Moss genera
Hookeriales
Taxonomy articles created by Polbot